Madonna and Child with Three Saints may refer to:
 Madonna and Child with Three Saints (Mantegna)
 Madonna and Child with Three Saints (Titian)